Vagococcus bubulae is a Gram-positive bacterium from the genus of Vagococcus which has been isolated from ground beef.

References 

Lactobacillales
Bacteria described in 2019